Jurica Žuža (born April 4, 1978) is a Croatian basketball coach and former basketball player serving as assistant coach for Lokomotiv Kuban of the VTB United League.

Professional career 
Žuža started his professional career at Zadar under coach Danijel Jusup.  After two years spent in the club and winning the 1998 Croatian Cup (first trophy for Zadar in independent Croatia), he played in Svjetlost Brod and then again in Zadar winning another Cup in 2000. After spending a season in Šanac Karlovac Žuža moved abroad to the Greek Iraklio. After that he spent a season in Panathinaikos coached by Željko Obradović during which he won the Greek League and Cup. He later spent a season in the Greek Ionikos and Italian Crabs Rimini before playing two and a half seasons for Cibona during which he became the Croatian League champion twice. After playing for the Greek Rethymno, Croatian Cedevita, Polish Poltava and Ukrainian Kryvbasbasket, during the 2010–11 season Žuža shortly again played for Zadar. Then he went to the Turkish Tofaş from Bursa and then to Trabzonspor, with whom he won the Turkish Second League. From there Žuža went to the Qatari Al Rayan, and in 2014 he made his final transfer to Lietkabelis where he played the last two seasons of his professional career. In the last season of his 20-year professional playing career Žuža helped his club win third place in the 2015–16 Baltic League.

Coaching career 
He began his coaching career as assistant coach for Lietkabelis, the same club he finished his playing career. Lietkabelis achieved its best result in history, finishing as runners-up in the 2016–17 Lithuanian League. The next season he was assistant coach for Neptūnas who came third in the  2017–18 Lithuanian League.

On July 20, 2022, he signed with Lokomotiv Kuban of the VTB United League.

References

External links
 Euroleague Profile
 RealGM Profile
 fiba.com Profile

1978 births
Living people
ABA League players
BC Lietkabelis coaches
BC Lietkabelis players
Croatian expatriate basketball people in Turkey
Croatian expatriate sportspeople in Italy
Croatian expatriate sportspeople in Lithuania
Croatian expatriate sportspeople in Qatar
Croatian expatriate sportspeople in Ukraine
Croatian men's basketball players
Centers (basketball)
Ionikos N.F. B.C. players
Irakleio B.C. players
KK Cedevita players
KK Cibona players
KK Zadar players
Panathinaikos B.C. players
Rethymno B.C. players
Basketball players from Zadar
Tofaş S.K. players
Trabzonspor B.K. players